Gjerstad is the administrative centre of Gjerstad municipality in Agder county, Norway. The village is located at the northern end of the lake Gjerstadvatnet at the northern end of the Norwegian County Road 418. The Sørlandsbanen railway line passes through the village and it stops at the Gjerstad Station. Gjerstad Church is located in the village along with a school and several stores.

Name
The village is named after the old Gjerstad farm (Old Norse: Geirreksstaðir), since the Gjerstad Church was built there. One explanation of the name says that the first element is the genitive case of the male name Geirrekr and the last element is staðir which means "homestead" or "farm".  Another possibly explanation of the first part of the name says that it comes from the word geirr which means "spear". Historically, the name has been spelled Gerikstadum (c. 1400), Gierestat (c. 1567), Gierrestad, and Gjerrestad.

Media gallery

References

Villages in Agder
Gjerstad